India held general elections to the 7th Lok Sabha in January 1980. The Janata Party alliance came into power after the elections to the 6th Lok Sabha held in 1977, riding the public anger against the Congress and the Emergency but its position was weak. The loose coalition barely held on to a majority with only 295 seats in the Lok Sabha and never quite had a firm grip on power.

INC(I) won 25 seats out of 26 seats in Gujarat with only Mehsana seat bagged by the Janata Party.

Party-wise results summary

Results- Constituency wise

References

Indian general elections in Gujarat
Gujarat
1980s in Gujarat